James Richard O'Shaughnessy, Baron O'Shaughnessy (born 26 March 1976) is a British Conservative politician and member of the House of Lords. He is now a senior partner at Newmarket Strategy, a medical consultancy which he founded in 2021.

Life
Of Irish extraction, O'Shaughnessy was born on 26 March 1976 in Taplow, Buckinghamshire, England. He was educated in Berkshire at Claires Court School then Wellington College. He went up to St Hugh's College, Oxford to read philosophy, politics and economics, graduating in 1998 with a Bachelor of Arts (BA) degree: as per tradition, his BA was promoted to a Master of Arts (MA Oxon) degree.

A former Downing Street aide, he was Director of Policy to Prime Minister David Cameron from May 2010 to October 2011.

Created a life peer on 1 October 2015, he took the title Baron O'Shaughnessy, of Maidenhead in the Royal County of Berkshire, before being appointed as Parliamentary Under Secretary of State at the Department of Health and Social Care and as a Lord-in-Waiting (i.e. Government Whip in the House of Lords) on 21 December 2016. He resigned on 31 December 2018 due to "family circumstances."

In March 2021, Lord O'Shaughnessy founded Newmarket Strategy, a medical consultancy.

See also
Burke's Peerage & Baronetage
Policy Exchange

References

1976 births
Living people
People educated at Claires Court School
People educated at Wellington College, Berkshire
British people of Irish descent
Alumni of St Hugh's College, Oxford
Life peers created by Elizabeth II
Conservative Party (UK) life peers